Samuel Gidudu (born 1968) is an Anglican bishop in Uganda: he has been Bishop of North Mbale since 2014. 

Gidudu was born in Sironko District and educated at the Uganda Christian University. He was ordained in 2002.

References

21st-century Anglican bishops in Uganda
Anglican bishops of North Mbale
Uganda Christian University alumni
Anglican archdeacons in Africa
People from Sironko District
1968 births
Living people